Georgios Modis (14 May 1887 – 18 June 1975) was a Greek jurist, politician, writer and participant in the Macedonian Struggle.

Biography 
Georgios Modis was born in 1887 in Monastir (modern Bitola). He graduated from the gymnasium of Monastir in 1906 and immediately joined the guerrilla group of the Cretan Georgios Volanis who was active in the area of Mariovo. He participated in many fights with Bulgarian komitadjis and Ottoman troops and was wounded in a battle with the Ottoman army in Besitsa, near Mariovo. After his injury he abandoned the armed struggle and the Internal Organisation of Monastir appointed him secretary in the Metropolis of Moglena and Florina in 1909, where he served for a short time. Then, he returned to Monastir and was a reporter in the local newspaper Fos ("Light") that was published by the Political Club of Monastir.

After the Balkan Wars, when Florina became part of Greece, he studied jurisprudence in the University of Athens and commerce in the academy of Othon Rousopoulos. He was elected continually for many years as a Member of the Hellenic Parliament for the Florina Prefecture and served as Prefect of Florina. During the period 1932–33 he assumed the position of Governor-General of Epirus. During the Axis occupation of Greece, he was arrested by the Germans and was imprisoned in the Pavlou Mela barracks in Thessaloniki. After his release, he fled to the Middle East where he joined the Greek government in exile. In October 1944 he returned to Greece and was appointed by Georgios Papandreou, as Governor-General of Macedonia. In 1950 he assumed the position of Minister of the Interior and in 1951 Minister of Education.

He was also an active author, his main works being: "Μακεδονικές Ιστορίες" (Macedonian Stories) and "Αγώνες στη Μακεδονία" (Struggles in Macedonia) which was left unfinished due to his death on 18 June 1975. Modis was a member of the Society for Macedonian Studies, and organised many committees of Macedonian Struggle fighters in order to raise statues to prominent protagonists of the Struggle. He also served as president of the committee for the construction of statues of Alexander the Great, Philip and Aristotle. During the Greek military junta of 1967–1974 he was forced by the regime to resign from the presidency of the committee.

In 2011, a bust of Modis was erected in the town square of Florina at the expense of the Association of Monastiriots of Florina and Environs "Elpis".

He is the nephew of Theodoros Modis and the uncle of Theodore Modis.

References 

1887 births
1975 deaths
Greek journalists
Greek writers
Ministers of the Interior of Greece
Liberal Party (Greece) politicians
Greek people of the Macedonian Struggle
People from Bitola
Governors-General of Macedonia
Members of the Hellenic Parliament
Governors-General of Epirus
Greek prisoners and detainees
Greek people of World War II
National and Kapodistrian University of Athens alumni
20th-century journalists
Greek people from the Ottoman Empire